A list of films produced in Egypt in 1985. For an A-Z list of films currently on Wikipedia, see :Category:Egyptian films.

External links
 Egyptian films of 1985 at the Internet Movie Database
 Egyptian films of 1985 elCinema.com

Lists of Egyptian films by year
1985 in Egypt
Lists of 1985 films by country or language